Emanuel V. Towfigh (born 1978) holds the Chair in Public Law, Empirical Legal Research and Law & Economics at EBS Law School and is Professor for Law & Economics at the EBS Business School. He served as the Law School’s Dean from 2018 to 2020. Since August 2021 he holds the position of Distinguished Scholar in Residence at Peking University School of Transnational Law.

Career 
Towfigh studied Law as well as Economics at the University of Münster, Germany and at Nanjing University, China. He obtained his doctoral degree at the University of Münster in 2006. Subsequently, he was a Senior Research Fellow at the Max Planck Institute for Research on Collective Goods (2007-2016), a Global Fellow and Hauser Research Scholar at New York University Law School (2011/12) and a Visiting Professor of Law at the University of Virginia Law School (2012/13).

His research includes work on Comparative Constitutional Law, Democracy, Political Parties, Law and Religion, (Behavioral) Law & Economics and Empirical Legal Studies.

Since 2016, Towfigh is one of the Editors-in-Chief of the German Law Journal, and helped transition the Journal over to Cambridge University Press where it is published since 2019.

Towfigh was an elected member of the Junge Akademie at the Berlin-Brandenburg Academy of Sciences and Humanities (BBAW) and the German National Academy of Sciences Leopoldina (2011-2016), and Member/Speaker of the Board (2014-2016). He has been  a member of the Supervisory Board of the Freudenberg Group since 2008.

Publications

Books
 Economic Methods for Lawyers, Edward Elgar International Academic Publisher, Cheltenham 2015 (joint work with  Niels Petersen et al.)
 Das Parteien-Paradox. Ein Beitrag zur Bestimmung des Verhältnisses von Demokratie und Parteien [The Paradox of the Parties. A Contribution to Defining the Relationship Between Democracy and Political Parties], Mohr Siebeck, Tübingen 2015

Journal articles
 Making Open Access Viable Economically, German Law Journal (2020) 21, pp. 1129–1133 (joint work with  Andrew Hyde  and  Russell A. Miller )
 Integrating theories of law obedience: How utility-theoretic factors, legitimacy, and lack of self-control influence decisions to commit low-level crimes (joint work with Berenike Waubert de Puiseau and Andreas Glöckner ), Judgement and Decision Making (JDM), Vol. 14(3) (2019), pp. 318–334
 Do direct-democratic procedures lead to higher acceptance than political representation? (joint work with  Sebastian Goerg  et al.), Public Choice, vol. 167(1-2) (2016), pp. 47–65
 Rational Choice and Its Limits, German Law Journal, vol. 17(5) (2016), pp. 763 – 778
 Empirical arguments in public law doctrine: Should empirical legal studies make a “doctrinal turn”?, International Journal of Constitutional Law (I•CON), vol. 12(3) (2014), pp. 670–691
 Game Over. Empirical Support for Soccer Bets Regulation, Psychology, Public Policy, and Law, vol. 17(3), pp. 475–505 (joint work with  Andreas Glöckner)
 First impressions are more important than early intervention: Qualifying broken windows theory in the lab (joint work with Christoph Engel et al.) ', International Review of Law and Economics (IRLE), vol. 37 (2014), pp. 126-136
 Development of Legal Expertise, Instructional Science, vol. 41(6) (2013), pp. 989-1007 (joint work with Andreas Glöckner, Christian Traxler)
Old Weimar meets New Political Economy: Democratic Representation in the Party State, German Law Journal,'' vol. 13(3) (2012), pp. 237–258

References

Weblinks 
Papers of Emanuel V. Towfigh in SSRN

Bibliography of Emanuel V. Towfigh  in the Catalogue of German National Library

https://www.towfigh.net/en/

Living people
1978 births
21st-century German lawyers
Constitutional law